Dorothy Wanja Nyingi (born 1974) is a Kenyan ichthyologist and recipient of the Ordre des Palmes académiques (Order of Academic Palms) for her work on Fish Biodiversity and Aquatic Ecology. She is the head of the Ichthyology Department at the National Museums of Kenya. She is the author of the first guide to fresh water fish in Kenya, Guide to the Common Freshwater Fishes of Kenya. She is a Kenyan freshwater ecologist focusing on community driven conservation

Education 
She attained a Bachelor of Science in Zoology from the University of Nairobi in 1998 and then a Master of Science in Hydrobiology from the University of Nairobi in 2002. She studied morphological and genetic diversity of Nile tilapia in Africa  at the University of Montpellier II where she earned a Masters of Science in 2004 and PhD in 2007 in Ecology and Evolutionary Biology. Her studies in France were supported by a scholarship awarded from the French government relayed by the Institute for Research and Development.

Career 
She is a partner of the International Partnership for the Satoyama Initiative (IPSI) that promotes collaboration in the conservation and restoration of sustainable human-influenced natural environments (Socio-Ecological Production Landscapes and Seascapes: SEPLS) through broader global recognition of their value, representing both KENWEB (The Kenya Wetlands Biodiversity Research Team) and the National Museums of Kenya.

See also
 Timeline of women in science

References

External links 

 Profile on International Institute for Sustainable Development site

Living people
21st-century Kenyan women scientists
21st-century Kenyan scientists
Ichthyologists
Women ichthyologists
Museums in Kenya
University of Montpellier alumni
Recipients of the Ordre des Palmes Académiques
University of Nairobi alumni
Kenyan biologists
1974 births